Jacob Tse Long Hin (born 6 February 1995 in Hong Kong) is a former Hong Kong professional footballer who played as a right back.

Club career
On 12 September 2015, Tse scored the first goal of the 2015–16 Hong Kong Premier League against Wong Tai Sin, which the match wins 2:0.

On 3 July 2017, Lee Man announced that they had acquired Tse on loan for the 2017–18 season.

On 19 July 2019, Tse was once again loaned to Lee Man.

In July 2020, Tse was released by Eastern after his contract expired.

On 17 October 2020, it was revealed that Tse had joined Pegasus.

On 25 October 2021, Tse joined Rangers.

On 17 July 2022, Tse joined Southern. On 11 December 2022, after the game against Lee Man, Tse has retired from professional football.

On 31 December 2022, Tse announced his retirement from professional football.

Personal life
On 12 December 2020, Tse married his long time girlfriend Himan.

References

External links
 
 Tse Long Hin at HKFA
 

1995 births
Living people
Hong Kong footballers
Hong Kong Premier League players
Hong Kong First Division League players
Eastern Sports Club footballers
Metro Gallery FC players
Hong Kong Rangers FC players
Lee Man FC players
TSW Pegasus FC players
South China AA players
Southern District FC players
Association football midfielders
Association football fullbacks
Footballers at the 2018 Asian Games
Asian Games competitors for Hong Kong